Bushkan Rural District is in Bushkan District of Dashtestan County, Bushehr province, Iran. At the census of 2006, its population was 4,409 960 households; there were 4,181 inhabitants in 1,075 households at the following census of 2011; and in the most recent census of 2016, the population of the rural district was 2,434 in 680 households. The largest of its nine villages was Nurabad, with 689 people.

References 

Rural Districts of Bushehr Province
Populated places in Dashtestan County